The Iranian Volleyball Super League 2012–13 was the 26th season of the Iranian Volleyball Super League, the highest professional volleyball league in Iran.

Regular season

Standings

 Paykan was docked 2 points due to not having a junior team.

Results

Playoffs

Semifinals
Paykan vs. Kalleh

|}

Matin vs. Saipa

|}

 Saipa forfeited the match against Matin after they walked out at the score of 23–25, 14–25, 25–23, 25–17, 14–11.

3rd place
Venue: Azadi Indoor Stadium, Tehran

Paykan vs. Saipa

|}

Final
Venue: Azadi Indoor Stadium, Tehran

Kalleh vs. Matin

|}

Final standings

References

External links
Iran Volleyball Federation

League 2012-13
Iran Super League, 2012-13
Iran Super League, 2012-13
Volleyball League, 2012-13
Volleyball League, 2012-13